Vélu is a commune in the Pas-de-Calais department in the Hauts-de-France region of France.

Geography

Population

Places of interest
 The church of St. Amand, rebuilt, along with much of the village, after World War I.

See also
Communes of the Pas-de-Calais department

References

Communes of Pas-de-Calais